Platteville High School is the only high school in the Platteville School District in Platteville, Wisconsin.  

Platteville High School has accumulated more Southwest Wisconsin Conference championships than any other school in the conference.

Notable alumni

Paul Chryst, former head football coach at the University of Pittsburgh and University of Wisconsin-Madison
Herbert Spencer Gasser, American physiologist who won the Nobel Prize for Physiology or Medicine in 1944.
Robert S. Travis, Jr., Wisconsin State Representative

References

External links
Platteville District website
Platteville High School website

Public high schools in Wisconsin
Schools in Grant County, Wisconsin